Carlo Taormina (born 16 December 1940, Rome) is an Italian lawyer, politician, jurist and academic. Before his political career, Taormina was one of the main commentators for the Italian sports talk program "Il Processo di Biscardi".

Lawyer career 
Taormina graduated in Law from university "La Sapienza" in Roma, becoming at first a Lawyer and, at a later time, a magistrate.

During Taormina's career as a lawyer he worked on many famous cases, including:

 Itavia Flight 870 accident, where he defended the officials accused of hiding valuable information that could have defined the causes of the incident
 Ardeatine massacre (he defended ex SS captain Erich Priebke, alongside Velio Di Rezze and Paolo Giachini)
 Murder of Marta Russo (he lodged a complaint against the magistrates and investigators, without having any connection with the defence of the accused Scattone, Ferraro and Liparota)
 Cogne Homicide (he substituted professor Carlo Federico Grosso in the defence of Annamaria Franzoni; he was subsequently substituted by lawyer Paola Savio)
 The homicide of SISMI agent Nicola Calipari in Baghdad, where he presided as the defender of Gianluca Preite
 Murder of Yara Gambirasio (he took part as a private citizen to the process arguing for a re-examination of the DNA found on the crime scene, to grant Massimo Giuseppe Bossetti, at the time facing life in prison, a more revision of his trial) 
 Cogne-case (replaced Professor Carlo Federico Grosso in the defense of Annamaria Franzoni; he was then replaced by the lawyer Paola Savio)

Taormina was also the private lawyer for:

 Some of the accused for Tangentopoli, including Bettino Craxi
 Vincenzio Muccioli,
 The boss of Sacra Corona Unita Francesco Prudentino;
 The Neo-Fascist Franco Freda in the court case for the disbandment of the political party Fronte Nazionale;
 The parents of the children from Rignano Flaminio (as a plaintiff lawyer), that were suspected of paedophilia.
 Mario Placanica, a carabiniere accused of the murder of Carlo Giuliani during the Group of Eight meetings in Genova in 2001;
 Nicola Di Girolamo during his trial for the criminal association for money laundering on an international level and the infraction of the electoral law as well as Mafia in 2010;
 Franco Fiorito in the scandal for peculation for the junta Polverini in Lazio during September 2012.

Academic career 
Taormina during his lawyer career was also dedicated to teaching other academics: in 1975 he became a professor of penal procedures at the Università di Macerata, he currently still teaches penal procedures at the Università degli Studi di Roma "Tor Vergata". His teaching method was influenced mainly by Alfredo De Marsico, Giuseppe Sabatini and Giovanni Conso. Taormina has also written a series of pamphlets and research papers, which mainly focus on the relationship between the accusers and the accused. some of his most famous scripts are a manual on process law and several monographs. In 1975 he became the editorial director for the specialistic newspaper " La Giustizia Penale". He also held the role of co-director for the paper "Il Foro Italiano".

Political career 
Taormina began his political career in 1996, becoming a candidate for Forza Italia for the Chamber of Deputies in the college of Roma Monte Sacro representing the Pole for Freedoms: he obtained 49.9% of the consensus and was defeated by a few voted by Ennio Parrelli representing the political coalition Ulivo.

Deputy for "Forza Italia" (2001–06) 
During the XIV legislature of Italy (2001–2006) he became a deputy representing Forza Italia being given the role of "Vice-Capogruppo" of the party in the chamber of deputies, he was elected in the "collegio 29" (Melzo) of the circumscription III (Lombardy 1) using the "lista civetta""of the 2001 Italian general election.

His political role was not renewed in the XV legislature (2006–08).

In regards to his political activities during these years and being Silvio Berlusconi's secretary and private lawyer Taormina declared:

Parliamentary secretary of the home office (2001) 
Taormina was briefly undersecretary to the Ministry of the Interior in the Berlusconi II government: he resigned after only six months (5 December 2001) when the press pointed out that his role as deputy secretary "for matters relating to the coordination of anti-racket and anti-usury initiatives, and the coordination of solidarity initiatives for the victims of mafia-type crimes " was in a conflict of interest with the exercise of legal defence in favour of various defendants for mafia events and in criminal trials in which the State had formed a civil party. In particular, the episode in which he presented himself as the legal defender of the boss of the "Sacra Corona Unita" Francesco Prudentino caused a sensation, accompanied by the escort he was entitled to as an undersecretary of the Ministry of the Interior.

Joining Five Star Movement 
In March 2016 Taormina announced his subscription to the Five Star Movement, which he had already supported in the 2014 European elections.

Taormina has however specified that he does not want to return to active politics and that he wants to continue his career as a lawyer, supporting Beppe Grillo's movement as a private citizen.

Law on legitimate suspicion 
Taormina extended the original text on the "ad personam" law on legitimate suspicion (called at a later time "Legge Cirami"):

Ilaria Alpi Commission and Telekom Serbia Commission 
Taormina was also the chairman of the parliamentary commission of inquiry into the death of Ilaria Alpi and Miran Hrovatin, at that time his involvement aroused controversy when he was accused of having used investigative powers to control the work of the other Commission based at the time in "Palazzo San Macuto". This commission was working on the "Telekom Serbia affair", of which he was also a member:

In September 2003, following the investigations of La Repubblica, he made amends and announced his withdrawal from political life. However, he remained in Parliament until 2006.

Legislative activity 
Taormina has presented several bills as the first signatory, mainly in the legal-procedural field, including:

 Provisions for the simplification of the criminal justice system (C.2668, approved as an integrated text with others)
 Provisions regarding the prescription of the crime and the conditional suspension of the sentence (C.2709)
 Indult concession (C.3151) – rejected
 Penitentiary treatment in emergency situations (C.3313) – Absorbed by the approval of the combined DDL
 Abolition of compulsory prosecution (C.3941)
 Discipline of the immunity of parliamentarians from criminal proceedings and from the execution of sentencing sentences (C.4615)
 Provisions for the reasonable length of trials and for the best protection of constitutional freedoms (C.6064)

As a co-signer, he presented proposals related to different topics (euthanasia, soft drugs, prostitution, death penalty, civil unions and same-sex marriage):

 Amendment to article 27 of the Constitution concerning the abolition of the death penalty (C.2072), to abolish the "cases foreseen by the military war laws" 
 Amendments to the Consolidated Law on Narcotic Drugs on the Legalization of Cannabis Derivatives, Controlled Heroin Administration, Therapeutic Use of Marijuana (C.2973)
 Euthanasia legalization provisions (C.2974) 
 Raising the minimum retirement age (C.2976) 
 Reduction of terms of pre-trial detention and for the simplification of early release procedures (C.2977) 
 Uninominal and majority reform of the electoral system of the Superior Council of the Magistracy (C.2978) 
 Provisions relating to the establishment of the register of civil unions of same-sex couples or of different sexes and the possibility for same-sex persons to access the institution of marriage (C.2982) 
 Simplification of procedures and reduction of time for obtaining a divorce (C.2983) 
 Rules on medically assisted procreation and therapeutic cloning (C.2984) 
 Provisions for the legalization of prostitution (C.2985) 
 State presidential reform (C.3942)

Judicial processes

Condamned for discrimination on the job of homosexual individuals 
Despite having supported liberal opinions such as the institution of homosexual civil unions, during his political activity, in 2013, he made some homophobic statements to the program "The mosquito" and has repeatedly stated that he does not want to hire lawyers, other collaborators or homosexual workers in his office.

The Bergamo Labor Court, following the appeal filed by the Advocate association for LGBTI rights – Lenford Network, considered that Taormina's expressions were, as discriminatory towards homosexuals, suitable to dissuade certain subjects from submitting their candidacies to professional study and, therefore, likely to hinder their access to work or make it more difficult, in violation of the rules protecting equal treatment in terms of employment and working conditions. For this reason, on 6 August 2014, Taormina was sentenced to pay the sum of 10,000.00 Euros as compensation for damages.

Following the sentencing, he challenged the measure asking for its reform to the Brescia Court of Appeal, which however, with a sentence of 11 December 2014, rejected his appeal and confirmed the first instance measure

Current activities 
Since 2007 Taormina has participated as a football commentator on the sports broadcast "Biscardi's trial", distinguishing himself both for his Romanist faith and for his aversion to Juventus. On 7 November 2008 he founded the Lega Italia, a movement chaired by Taormina himself, with which he ran for the presidency of the Lazio region in the 2010 regional elections. In 2009 he launched himself against Beppino Englaro and the magistrates of Udine for allowing death by Eluana Englaro, announcing a premeditated murder complaint.

Taormina opposed the bill on the short trial, calling it "Shameful, criminal, criminogenic and ridiculous". According to Taormina, Berlusconi has pressed for the approval of the short trial as a threat to raise the price and obtain the law on the legitimate impediment. This rule, which according to Taormina is "clearly unconstitutional" in that "the precondition for impediment is a charge", is explicitly temporary to allow the approval of an Alfano-bis award as a constitutional law.

In 2011 he was appointed prince regent of Filettino, a municipality in the Frosinone area whose mayor, in reaction to the "common-cut" maneuver of the last Berlusconi government, started a secessionist movement. On the maneuver of the Monti government, Taormina declared himself in harmony with the Northern League. In an interview with the radio program La Zanzara answers the question "What is the greatest criminal who defended?" saying he was an MP from Christian Democrats now no longer in politics.

In 2017 he was one of the many signers of the appeal of the newspaper "Il Tempo" asking for release, with postponement and suspension under penalty of health reasons, in favor of the former parliamentarian Marcello Dell'Utri, sentenced for external competition in mafia association and other crimes minors.

Pop culture 
Carlo Taormina makes an appearance as an animated character in the animated film Somalia94 – The Ilaria Alpi case by Marco Giolo, published by Dynit.

References 

Academic staff of the University of Rome Tor Vergata
Academic staff of the University of Macerata
Sapienza University of Rome alumni
Forza Italia politicians
Italian columnists
Italian newspaper editors
Deputies of Legislature XIV of Italy
1940 births
Living people